Émerainville is a commune in the Seine-et-Marne département in the Île-de-France region in north-central France.

Demographics
Inhabitants of Émerainville are called Émerainvillois in French.

Education
Primary school groups (combined preschools and elementary schools) include Bois d'Emery, Jean-Jaurès, La Mare l'Embûche, Lavoisier, and Malnoue II. There is one junior high school, Collège Vincent Van Gogh. There is one tertiary educational institution, Université de Technologie et d'Enseignement Consulaire.

Parks and recreation
Athletic facilities:
 Gymnase Jacques Anquetil
 Piscine d'Emerainville
 Stade Dominique Rocheteau
 Espace sportif Guy Drut (sports hall)

See also
Communes of the Seine-et-Marne department

References

External links

Official Site 

Communes of Seine-et-Marne
Val Maubuée